Hazebrouck station (French: Gare d'Hazelbrouck) is a railway station serving the town of Hazebrouck, Nord department, northern France.  This part of French Flanders is near West Flanders in Belgium.

Services
Hazebrouck station is the junction of the Lille to Fontinettes (Calais) railway and the Arras–Dunkirk railway. The station is served by regional trains to Calais, Dunkirk, Arras and Lille.

References 

Railway stations in Nord (French department)
Railway stations in France opened in 1848